The List of women's road cycling transfers 2014 lists the women cyclist transfers for the 2014 women's cycling season of the 2014 UCI Women's Teams.

Team Argos–Shimano

In

Out

BePink

In

Out

Bigla Cycling Team
New UCI Women Team in 2014.

In

Boels–Dolmans Cycling Team

In

Out

Faren Kuota

In

Out

Futurumshop.nl–Zannata
Combined team of CyclelivePlus Zannata and Team Futurumshop.nl

In

Out (Team Futurumshop.nl)

GSD Gestion-Kallisto

In

Out

Hitec Products UCK

In

Out

Lointek

In

Lotto–Belisol Ladies

In

Out

MCipollini–Giordana

In

Out

S.C. Michela Fanini-Rox

In

Out

Orica–AIS

In

Out

Parkhotel Valkenburg p/b Math Salden
The team was a non-UCI team in 2013 but gets a UCI licence for 2014. Riders who stayed from the 2013 non-UCI team are (all Dutch): Aafke Eshuis, Sophie de Boer, Bianca van den Hoek,  Ilona Hoeksma, Riejanne Markus, Jermaine Post, Rozanne Slik, Lisanne Soemanta.

In

In

Out

Team Rytger
New UCI Women Team in 2014.

In

Sengers Ladies Cycling Team

In

Out

In

Out

Team TIBCO

In

Out

Top Girls Fassa Bortolo

In

Out

Topsport Vlaanderen–Pro-Duo

In

Out

United Healthcare
New UCI Women Team in 2014.

In

Vaiano Fondriest

In

Out

Vienne Futuroscope

In

Out

Wiggle–Honda

In

Out

See also

 List of 2014 UCI Women's Teams
 2014 in women's road cycling

References

External links
Transfers list on podiumcafe.com
Transfers list on cyclingfever.com

Sports business by sport
Women's road cycling
2014 in women's road cycling
Women's sport-related lists